Mary Margaret Graham was the United States Deputy Director of National Intelligence for Collection (2005–2008).

Background

Education
Graham is a graduate of Marywood College in Scranton, Pennsylvania and obtained a master's degree in Russian Studies at The Maxwell School of Syracuse University.

Honors and awards 
Graham has earned prestigious honors for her service: National Intelligence Distinguished Service Medal, the Distinguished Career Intelligence Medal, and the Secretary of Defense Meritorious Civilian Service Award, and the Donovan Award in 2001.

Family

Career 
In May 2005, Mary Margaret Graham was appointed as Deputy Director of National Intelligence for Collection. In this role, Graham worked on behalf of the Director of National Intelligence to coordinate and integrate the collection efforts of the 15 intelligence agencies and ensures that the DNI priorities are appropriately reflected in future planning and systems acquisition decisions.

Mary Margaret Graham recently served as the Associate Deputy Director for Operations for Counterintelligence at the Central Intelligence Agency. In her 27 years with the CIA, she has had numerous field and headquarters assignments. From 1999 to 2001, Graham served as Chief of the Directorate of Operation's National Resources Division. She also served as the Executive Assistant William Crowell, then Deputy Director of the National Security Agency.

Speeches
Graham made headlines when she inadvertently disclosed the size of the national intelligence budget during a speech in San Antonio, Texas on October 31, 2005, according to U.S. News & World Report.

See also
Director of National Intelligence

References

Living people
Year of birth missing (living people)
United States Deputy Directors of National Intelligence
People of the Central Intelligence Agency
Harvard Institute of Politics